James Clifton Wright (born December 21, 1950) is a former professional baseball pitcher. He played two seasons in Major League Baseball for the Boston Red Sox in 1978-79. Wright was born in Reed City, Michigan.

Career
Wright was drafted out of high school by the Red Sox in the fourth round of the 1969 Major League Baseball Draft. He spent several years working his way up through their minor league organization, primarily as a starting pitcher. His breakthrough came in 1977 with the Triple-A Pawtucket Red Sox, where he went 12-8 with a 2.94 ERA.

Wright made the Red Sox out of spring training in 1978 and went on to pitch 3 shutouts in 24 games (16 of them starts) as a rookie. He posted an 8-4 win–loss record with an ERA of 3.57 by the end of the season. As a fielder, Wright committed one error in 17 total chances.

Wright pitched six shutout innings in his first start of 1979. However, it wound up as his only start of the year, as he was moved to the bullpen to make room in the rotation for rookie Chuck Rainey. He did not pitch at all after an arm injury in early June, playing his final game on June 6. He finished with a record of 1-0 and an ERA of 5.09. He also committed no errors that season.

In 1980, Wright returned to the minor leagues, pitching for Pawtucket. He finished his professional career spending the 1981-82 seasons in the Toronto Blue Jays organization with the Syracuse Chiefs.

External links

Major League Baseball pitchers
Boston Red Sox players
Jamestown Falcons players
Greenville Red Sox players
Winston-Salem Red Sox players
Anderson Giants players
Bristol Red Sox players
Pawtucket Red Sox players
Rhode Island Red Sox players
Syracuse Chiefs players
Baseball players from Michigan
People from Reed City, Michigan
Living people
1950 births